This is a list of songs featuring Canadian artists which have reached number one on the Billboard Hot 100. Canadian artists are listed in bold. Weeks followed by an asterisk (*) indicates that the song is still charting and subject to change.

See also
List of Billboard Hot 100 number-ones by British artists
List of Billboard Hot 100 number-ones by Australian artists
List of Billboard Hot 100 number-ones by European artists

Canadian artists
Billboard Hot 100